In Orange is a 2004 Dutch drama family film. In Orange received a Golden Film after it had sold 100,000 cinema tickets in the Netherlands. The film also received international awards at film festivals in Hamburg, Isfahan, Kristiansand, Los Angeles, Poznań, and Rimouski.

Cast
Yannick van de Velde - Remco van Leeuwen
Wendy van Dijk - Sylvia van Leeuwen
Thomas Acda - Erik van Leeuwen
Peter Blok - Arend Te Pas
Dionicho Muskiet - Winston Mijnals
Valérie Dupont - Lisa van Leeuw
Maaike Polder - Anneke
Sterre Herstel - Suzan van Leeuwen
Porgy Franssen - Dokter Vlieberg
Pepijn Gunneweg - hulp in de winkel
Ton Kas - rechercheur
Pim Muda - rechercheur

References

External links

2000s Dutch-language films
Dutch children's films
Dutch sports drama films
Dutch association football films
Films set in the Netherlands
2000s sports drama films
2004 films
2004 drama films